Efficient Power Conversion (EPC) is a semiconductor company that produces transistors and integrated circuits based on gallium nitride (GaN). The company was founded in 2007 by Alex Lidow, Joe Cao and Robert Beach, with Lidow continuing as CEO. The company is based in El Segundo, California. Its eGaN® FETs and ICs are widely used in the Light Detection and Ranging (Lidar) systems for self-driving and autonomous vehicles, such as the lidar systems developed by Velodyne. In 2020, the company entered into a joint venture with VPT to form EPC Space which provides radiation-hardened GaN devices for space applications.

References 

Semiconductor companies of the United States
Technology companies established in 2007